Roger Stevens may refer to:

 Roger Stevens (diplomat) (1906–1980), British academic, diplomat and civil servant
 Roger L. Stevens (1910–1998), American theatrical producer, arts administrator and real estate executive
 Roger Stevens, Belgian judge, President of the Council of State